Simon Shaheen (Arabic: سيمون شاهين, ; born Tarshiha, Upper Galilee, Palestine, 1955) is a Palestinian-American oud and violin player and composer who holds Israeli citizenship.

At the age of 2, Shaheen moved with his family to Haifa, but spent most of the weekends in Tarshiha, an Arab village in Galilee.  The Shaheen family is known for its musicality with music instructor and father Hikmat, oud-playing and instrument-making brother Najib, violinist and oud playing William, and singing sisters Laura and Rosette.

Music career
He began playing the oud at 5, and the violin shortly thereafter.  He attended Tel Aviv University, earning degrees in Arabic literature and music performance.  He later pursued further studies at Hebrew University of Jerusalem.  In 1980 he emigrated to the United States to study music at the Manhattan School of Music and Columbia University, eventually becoming a U.S. citizen.

He founded the Near Eastern Music Ensemble and organizes arts festivals and retreats. Shaheen also heads the Arabic Music Retreat, held annually at Mt. Holyoke College's campus in Massachusetts which brings together a large faculty instructing Arabic music for a week and concludes with a concert.

Shaheen, a Catholic Arab, lives in New York City, where he leads an Arabic ensemble called Qantara which he formed.

In 1994 he received a National Heritage Fellowship from the National Endowment for the Arts.

In addition to his work in traditional and classical Arabic music, Shaheen has participated in many cross-cultural musical projects, including performing with producer Bill Laswell, Colombian singer Soraya, Henry Threadgill, Vishwa Mohan Bhatt, and with Jewish klezmer musicians The Klezmatics.

Select discography
1990 – Music of Waheeb, Mango/Island/PolyGram
1990 – The Music of Mohamed Abdel Wahab, Axiom/Island/PolyGram
1992 – Turath (Heritage), CMP
1993 – Taqasim: Art of Improvisation in Arabic Music
1996 – Saltanah (with V. M. Bhatt), Water Lily Acoustics
2001 – Blue Flame, Ark 21/Universal

References

External links
Simon Shaheen official site
"Bridges," 2001 article
[ AllMusic entry]

1955 births
Living people
American male composers
21st-century American composers
American male violinists
American oud players
Manhattan School of Music alumni
National Heritage Fellowship winners
Oud players
Tel Aviv University alumni
People from Ma'alot-Tarshiha
American people of Palestinian descent
Israeli emigrants to the United States
21st-century American violinists
21st-century American male musicians